Frosted Mini-Wheats (also known as Frosted Wheats and Mini Max in the United Kingdom, Mini-Wheats! in Canada, and Toppas in certain European countries; also referred as "Mini-Wheats" in the US) is a breakfast cereal manufactured by Kellogg's consisting of shredded wheat cereal pieces and frosting.

History
Kelloggs introduced Frosted Mini-Wheats in the United States in 1969 as a large size portion that was available in regular and brown sugar/cinnamon flavor, later followed by a bite-size portion introduced in 1980. The original large size Mini-Wheats was renamed "Big Bite" by 2001 and discontinued entirely in 2015. In 1999, Kellogg's went into the line by introducing a non-frosted Mini-Wheats variety that contained raisin filling, replacing Raisin Squares. It was discontinued in two years. Frosted Wheats were available from the 1980s until the early 1990s in the United Kingdom under the Toppas name.  They subsequently disappeared from shop shelves but were reissued several years later under the Frosted Wheats brand, similar to that used elsewhere in the world. The new cereal uses far smaller pieces of frosted wheat parcel than the original Toppas and contains beef gelatin. Initially Kellogg's Mini-Wheats were available without the sugar frosting and with raisins or blueberries in the center. The Mini-Wheats recipe when produced in Canada or the United States was slightly different. Since January 2008, Canadian-produced (plant in Belleville, Ontario) Mini-Wheats are available in Canada and are imported into the US.

Advertising

United States
Frosted Mini-Wheats are marketed in several ways.  There was a short stint of television advertisements featuring a Frosted Mini-Wheat biscuit with "split personalities;" the sweet (frosted) side and wheat (shredded grain) side, who argued over who was more popular. When the new MyPyramid debuted, launching the whole grain craze, Frosted Mini Wheats enjoyed another short-lived advertising stint as a fiber-conscious cereal.  These advertisements involved a man walking around, asking "Have you had your fiber today?", then handing unsuspecting, confused people a bowl of the cereal.  However, these ads have been discontinued. Meanwhile, in the early/mid-1990s, several ads aired showcasing conflict between children raving about the frosting and adults raving about the whole grain wheat. The best-known of these, "The Kid in You" ads, feature adults turning into children and kids turning into adults (actress Marcia Wallace appears in one of those "Kid in Us" spots, and one used the famous line from When Harry Met Sally..., "I'll have what she's having", which was said by an elderly woman sitting next to a young businesswoman who turned into a 13-year-old girl in front of her).

Current advertising involves Frosted Mini-Wheats helping children in various childhood situations.  In one, a girl in a spelling bee retracts a letter after speaking it and passes, despite the fact that it is against the rules in an actual Spelling Bee competition.  Another has the Mini-Wheat helping a girl keep time to a dance in a school play.  It promotes eating breakfast in general. The tagline says, "Keeps 'em [your kids] full, and keeps 'em focused." The Federal Trade Commission found fault with Kellogg's claims that Frosted Mini-Wheats cereal improved kids' attentiveness by nearly 20%. The consumer protection agency said that Kellogg's had misrepresented a study and violated federal law.

In 2009, Kelloggs introduced a "Little Bites" spinoff of the Mini-Wheats brand. This version had smaller squares and came in three flavors: Original, Chocolate, and Honey Nut.  Eventually, the Honey Nut flavor was taken off of shelves and replaced with Cinnamon Roll, which was also short-lived.

In 2011, Kelloggs introduced Frosted Mini-Wheats with Fruit in the Middle, which features strawberries and blueberries in the center.  These are similar to the original Strawberry Mini-Wheats that Kellogg's sold in the 1990s which contained strawberry filling in the middle, as well as Raisin Squares and its successor Mini-Wheats Raisin, and Fruit Wheats, a variant of Nabisco Shredded Wheat made in the 1980s.

Canada
An ad for Mini-Wheats that aired in Canada in the early-1990s featured an animated "Mr. Mini-Wheat" (voiced by John Stocker) about to go on a blind date. After experiencing some pre-date anxiety, a disembodied voice convinces Mr. Mini-Wheat that between his wholesome wheatiness and his frosted side, he has much to offer. Now quite confident, Mr. Mini-Wheat sets off for his date, proclaiming that "She'll be my love slave forever!". This line was quickly changed to "She'll be my true love forever!" for later airings.

More recently, an advertisement for Vanilla flavored Mini-Wheats featured an animated Mr. Mini-Wheat singing and dancing to a tune based on "Agadoo" by Black Lace. The success of the commercial prompted several more in this series:

 Strawberry Flavour: Mr. Mini-Wheat sings with a 1960s rock-and-roll band.
 Whole Wheat: Mr. Mini-Wheat sings in a 1970s disco club.
 Blueberry Muffin: Mr. Mini-Wheat sings to the tune of Galop Inferno.
 Cinnamon Streusel

Varieties

Frosted Mini-Wheats currently come in the following varieties:
 Bite Size Frosted Maple Brown Sugar
 Bite Size Frosted Blueberry (formerly named Blueberry Muffin)
 Bite Size Frosted Original
 Bite Size Pumpkin Spice (seasonal)
 Bite Size Frosted Strawberry (formerly named Strawberry Delight)
 Unfrosted Mini-Wheats
 Little Bites Original
 Little Bites Chocolate
 Touch of Fruit in the Middle Raspberry (US)
 Centres Mixed Berry (Canada)
The following varieties have been discontinued:
 Bite Size Frosted Apple (served in the 80's)
 Bite Size Frosted Vanilla Creme (2006-2009)
 Bite Size Frosted Cinnamon Streusel
 Bite Size Frosted Chocolate
 Frosted Mini-Wheats Big Bite (2015)
 Crunch Brown Sugar (2013)
 Harvest Delight Cranberry
 Harvest Delight Blueberry
 Little Bites Honey Nut (discontinued in 2010)
 Little Bites Cinnamon Roll (introduced February 2012)
 Touch of Fruit in the Middle Mixed Berry (US)
 Touch of Fruit in the Middle Raisin (US, 2014)
 Touch of Fruit in the Middle Strawberry (served in the 90s)
 Mini wheats Dark Chocolate

Ingredients
Frosted Mini-Wheats contains whole grain wheat, sugar and gelatin. Since Frosted Mini-Wheats contains gelatin, it is not vegetarian (gelatin is made from collagen which comes from animal bones and fat). By 2012, brown rice sugar was added to the list of ingredients.

Recall
There was a voluntary recall of certain Frosted Mini-Wheats products in October 2012 due to possible presence of metal fragments from a faulty Kellogg's manufacturing plant.

References

External links

 
 Nutrition Facts and Analysis
 Voluntary Recall of Select Packages of Frosted Mini-Wheats Bite Size Original and Mini-Wheats Unfrosted Bite Size

Kellogg's cereals
Products introduced in 1969
Wheat
Wheat production in Canada